The Palawan frogmouth (Batrachostomus chaseni) is a species of bird in the family Podargidae.
It is found on Palawan in the Philippines.  Its natural habitat is subtropical or tropical moist lowland forest. It is sometimes considered conspecific with the Javan and Blyth's frogmouth.

References

Batrachostomus
Birds described in 1937
Endemic fauna of the Philippines
Fauna of Palawan